The 2013 season is Cruzeiro's ninety-second season in existence and the club's forty-third consecutive season in the top flight of Brazilian football.

Squad

Source: Cruzeiro Official Web Site

Statistics

Top scorers

Club

Coaching staff

Transfers

In

Out

Overview

Friendlies

Competitions

Campeonato Brasileiro

Results summary

Matches

Campeonato Mineiro

Results Summary

First stage

Knockout stage

Semi-finals

Finals

Copa do Brasil

Results Summary

First round

Second round

Third round

Fourth Round

References

External links
 

Cruzeiro Esporte Clube seasons
Cruzeiro